Lithuania will be represented by 25 athletes at the 2010 European Athletics Championships held in Barcelona, Spain.

Participants

Results

Men
Track and road events

Field events

Women
Track and road events

Field events

References 
 LLAF official website

Nations at the 2010 European Athletics Championships
2010
European Athletics Championships